Steve Chirico (born April 15, 1960) is an American politician and the Mayor of Naperville, Illinois. He was elected as George Pradel's successor on April 7, 2015, being sworn in on May 3, 2015. He is a past member of the Naperville City Council, defeating fellow city Council member Doug Kraus. Chirico emphasized his success as a business owner in Naperville during the election, specifically his position as founder and president of Great Western Flooring, which is now run by his daughters. Chirico voted and campaigned for Joe Biden. He and his wife Julie have seven children: Lauren, Jenna, Dana, Tara, Austin, Jonathon, and Kayla. He attended Northern Illinois University.

On February 4, 2020, Governor J.B. Pritzker appointed Chirico to serve as a Trustee of the newly created Firefighters' Pension Investment Fund for a term starting January 31, 2020 and ending the date on which the initial permanent board members are elected and qualified. As of May 16, 2020, the appointment is awaiting confirmation in the Illinois Senate. Chirico then endorsed the Democratic Party presidential ticket of Joe Biden and Kamala Harris in the 2020 United States presidential election over the Republican ticket of incumbents Donald Trump and Mike Pence. Chirico previously declined to endorse Trump in the 2016 election.

References

1960 births
Living people
Northern Illinois University alumni
Illinois city council members
Mayors of Naperville, Illinois
21st-century American politicians
Illinois Republicans